Gregory Kolovakos (July 30, 1951 – April 16, 1990) was an American literary translator and activist, best known as a translator of Latin American literature by writers such as Jorge Luis Borges, Julio Cortázar, José Donoso and Mario Vargas Llosa, and as the founding executive director of the Gay and Lesbian Alliance Against Defamation.

He was also director of the literature program for the New York State Council on the Arts, a board member of the Lesbian and Gay Community Service Center, and a founder of the AIDS Treatment Project and the PEN Fund for Writers and Editors with AIDS.

He died of AIDS on April 16, 1990 at his home in Manhattan. He was survived by his partner Bruce Becker. Following his death, the PEN American Center's Gregory Kolovakos Award and the Lambda Literary Foundation's Gregory Kolovakos Award for AIDS Literature were named in his honour.

References

1951 births
1990 deaths
American LGBT rights activists
American gay writers
AIDS-related deaths in New York (state)
Writers from New York City
20th-century American translators
20th-century American LGBT people